Microbacterium hydrothermale is a Gram-positive, aerobic, rod-shaped and non-motile bacterium from the genus Microbacterium which has been isolated from hydrothermal sediments from the Indian Ocean.

References

External links 

Type strain of Microbacterium hydrothermale at BacDive -  the Bacterial Diversity Metadatabase

Bacteria described in 2014
hydrothermale